Jaber Mohammed Sagheer Al-Owaisi (born 4 November 1989), commonly known as Jaber Al-Owaisi, is an Omani footballer who plays for Al-Shabab Club in Oman Professional League.

Club career

On 30 July 2013, he signed a one-year contract extension with Al-Shabab Club. On 19 August 2014, he again signed a one-year contract extension with Al-Shabab Club.

Club career statistics

International career
Jaber is part of the first team squad of the Oman national football team. He was selected for the national team for the first time in 2011. He made his first appearance for Oman on 20 January 2010 in a friendly match against Sweden. He has made appearances in the 2012 WAFF Championship, the 2014 FIFA World Cup qualification, 2015 AFC Asian Cup qualification and the 2014 Gulf Cup of Nations and has represented the national team in the 2011 AFC Asian Cup qualification and the 2013 Gulf Cup of Nations.

National team career statistics

Goals for Senior National Team
Scores and results list Oman's goal tally first.

Honours

Club
With Al-Shabab
Omani League Runner-Up: 2011–12

References

External links
 
 
 Jaber Al-Owaisi at Goal.com
 
 
 Jaber Al-Owaisi - ASIAN CUP Australia 2015

1989 births
Living people
People from Barka, Oman
Omani footballers
Oman international footballers
Association football defenders
2015 AFC Asian Cup players
Al-Seeb Club players
Al-Shabab SC (Seeb) players
Oman Professional League players
Footballers at the 2010 Asian Games
Asian Games competitors for Oman